Meranda susialis is a moth of the family Noctuidae first described by Francis Walker in 1859. It is known from Australia.

References

Catocalinae